Donald Earle Messick (September 7, 1926 – October 24, 1997) was an American voice actor. He was best known for his performances in Hanna-Barbera cartoons.

His best-remembered vocal creations include Scooby-Doo, Bamm-Bamm Rubble and Hoppy in The Flintstones, Astro in The Jetsons, Muttley in Wacky Races and Dastardly and Muttley in Their Flying Machines, Boo-Boo Bear and Ranger Smith in The Yogi Bear Show, Sebastian the Cat in Josie and the Pussycats; Gears, Ratchet, and Scavenger in The Transformers, Papa Smurf and Azrael in The Smurfs, Hamton J. Pig in Tiny Toon Adventures, and Dr. Benton Quest in Jonny Quest.

Early life
Messick was born on September 7, 1926 in Buffalo, New York, the son of Binford Earl Messick, a house painter, and Lena Birch ( Hughes).  He was raised by his maternal grandparents in the Bolton Hill neighborhood of Baltimore,  where he received his early training as a performer at the Ramsay Street School of Acting.

Career

Early work
At first, Messick wanted to be a ventriloquist and even supported himself as one for a time in the late 1940s and early 1950s. At age 15, Messick performed in front of the program manager and chief announcer at radio station WBOC in Salisbury, Maryland, and was given his own weekly show, for which Messick performed all of the character voices and sound effects.

Messick moved back to Baltimore a year later, after graduating high school, and approached radio station WCAO about getting his one-man show on the air. As Messick worked to reduce the Baltimore accent identified by the manager of WCAO as an impediment to his radio career, Messick's father was killed, along with two other men, in an accident at the Nanticoke School. Two other workers and he were taking down a flagpole when it came into contact with electric power lines, electrocuting all three men.

In 1944, Messick joined the US Army, performing for troops as a part of the Special Services for 20 months. Messick's first big break came when he was hired by the Mutual Broadcasting radio station in Los Angeles, where he played Raggedy Andy and Farmer Seedling on the radio series The Raggedy Ann Show.

At MGM, Tex Avery was producing the Droopy cartoons. The regular voice actor Bill Thompson was unavailable. Avery hired Messick after Daws Butler, who voiced characters for MGM, suggested him.

Early Hanna Barbera voice work
When William Hanna and Joseph Barbera formed their own animation studio, Hanna-Barbera, in 1957, Messick and Butler became a voice-acting team for the company. Messick and Butler's first collaboration was Ruff and Reddy. Messick was Ruff the cat and the Droopy-sounding Professor Gizmo, while Butler played the dog, Reddy. Messick also narrated the show, which had a serialized storyline. From 1958 to 1959, Messick played Tadpole in the animated television series,  Spunky and Tadpole, produced by Beverly Hills Productions.

From 1957 to 1965, Butler and Messick gave voice to a large number of characters. Always the sidekick, Messick's characters were not headliners. His notable roles in this era were Boo Boo Bear, Ranger Smith, Major Minor, Pixie Mouse, Astro, and Dr. Benton Quest replacing John Stephenson.

He was used primarily for his narration skills, which were heard on many of those cartoons in which Daws Butler starred. In narrating The Huckleberry Hound Show Yogi Bear cartoons, he played Ranger Smith in something close to his natural voice.

Messick was eventually featured as Ricochet Rabbit in Ricochet Rabbit (1964–65), while Deputy Droop-a-Long was voiced by Mel Blanc. He did the voices of the title character in Precious Pupp and Shag Rugg from Hillbilly Bears, and both segments from The Atom Ant/Secret Squirrel Show. In 1966, Messick took over the roles of Atom Ant and Mr. Peebles of The Magilla Gorilla Show from Howard Morris, who had left Hanna-Barbera.

In outer-space cartoons, Don Messick created noises and sounds for weird space creatures and aliens. His Ranger Smith voice was often heard as various space villains. His narrator voice was given to Vapor Man, Dr. Benton Quest, the Perilous Paper Doll Man, and Multi Man.

Scooby-Doo and later roles
In 1969, he was cast as the cowardly canine title character on Scooby-Doo, Where Are You!. He voiced him through all of the various versions of Scooby-Doo: on television in numerous formats from 1969 until his retirement, including television films, and a number of commercials, as well. In 1970, he voiced Sebastian on Josie and the Pussycats, and reprised the role in its spin-off Josie and the Pussycats in Outer Space two years later, as well as voicing the new alien character, Bleep. From 1980 to 1988, he voiced Scooby's nephew, Scrappy-Doo, having taken over the role originated by Lennie Weinrib in 1979; he continued to voice Scooby-Doo when A Pup Named Scooby-Doo came along from 1988 to 1991.

In Hong Kong Phooey, he was the voice of Spot the Cat, a faithful sidekick that was the one who foiled the villain's plans, though he let the clueless title character take the glory. In 1977, he voiced Balin and a few incidental characters in the first animated adaptation of The Hobbit by J. R. R. Tolkien.

By the 1970s, the popularity of Yogi Bear led to several spin-off TV series and television movies featuring the character. Messick reprised his roles of Boo-Boo and Ranger Smith from the 1970s until 1994 on Yogi's Gang, Laff-a-Lympics, Yogi's Treasure Hunt, and The New Yogi Bear Show.

He played Papa Smurf on The Smurfs from 1981 to 1989 and Ratchet (the Autobot doctor), Gears, and Constructicon Scavenger on The Transformers. In 1985, new episodes of The Jetsons were produced and Messick returned as Astro, RUDI, Mac, and Uniblab, a pesky robot that worked for Mr. Spacely.

He also starred in the Masters of the Universe Golden Book video as He-Man. In 1985, he voiced Louie and Snichey in The Pound Puppies TV special, in 1988, he had an uncredited role as the Pimp of the Year pageant announcer on I'm Gonna Git You Sucka, and he returned to his role of Benton Quest on The New Adventures of Jonny Quest (1986–1987).

Messick also played a live-action role on the MTM Enterprises sitcom Duck Factory, playing a cartoon voice actor named Wally Wooster. In one episode, frequent collaborator Frank Welker guest-starred as a rival voice artist angling for his job. Don Messick said of his character on the show: "Wally was never quite sure whether he was Wally or Dippy Duck".

From 1990 to 1995, he voiced Hamton J. Pig in Amblin's Tiny Toon Adventures and its spin-offs. Around that time, he also returned as the voice of Droopy for Tom & Jerry Kids and Droopy, Master Detective. On the 1995 Freakazoid! episode "Toby Danger/Doomsday Bet", a spoof of Jonny Quest, he played Dr. Vernon Danger, a parody of his own Dr. Benton Quest.

At a charity speaking engagement in London, shortly before his death, he performed many of his characters, except Scooby-Doo. He claimed that giving up smoking had robbed him of the rasp in the voice that he needed to voice him.

Retirement
In late September 1996, Messick retired from acting after he suffered a stroke at a recording session at Hanna-Barbera.

On October 12, 1996, he had a "retirement party" at his favorite Chinese restaurant (Joseph Barbera personally sent a limo to Messick and his wife, and the two were chauffeured). Many of his friends and peers during his career who had come to pay tribute to him included Henry Corden, Casey Kasem, Lucille Bliss, Maurice LaMarche, Gregg Berger, Neil Ross, June Foray, Sharon Mack, Greg Burson, Walker Edmiston, Marvin Kaplan, Gary Owens, Howard Morris, Teresa Ganzel, Jean Vander Pyl, and Myrtis Martin Butler (Daws' widow).

Personal life
Messick married Helen McHugh on October 10, 1949, and they remained married until Messick's death on October 24, 1997.

Death
Don Messick suffered a second stroke and died on October 24, 1997, in Salinas, California. He was 71 years old.

Legacy
Since Messick's death in 1997, Hadley Kay, Scott Innes, Neil Fanning, and Frank Welker have all voiced the role of Scooby-Doo. In 1998, Scooby-Doo on Zombie Island was dedicated to his memory. In 2011, Jonathan Winters (who voiced Grandpa Smurf in the television series) became Messick's successor as the voice of Papa Smurf in The Smurfs and its 2013 sequel. Winters died after finishing his voice work on the latter film. In 2000, Billy West also became one of Messick's successors as the new voice of Muttley in the 2000 Dreamcast video game, the 2017 reboot of Wacky Races, and in the Scooby-Doo theatrical animated film Scoob! which featured archive recordings of Messick for Muttley’s laugh and a place named after him called “Messick Mountain”

Filmography

Radio

Films

Television

Video games

Theme park attractions

References

External links

 Don Messick Tribute (archived), includes short biography
 

1926 births
1997 deaths
20th-century American male actors
American male radio actors
American male voice actors
Burials at sea
Hanna-Barbera people
Male actors from Buffalo, New York
People from Baltimore
United States Army personnel of World War II
Ventriloquists